The Honourable Attorney General of Montserrat, usually known simply as the Attorney General, is the chief legal adviser to The Crown and the Government of Montserrat. In addition to providing legal advice to government departments and various statutory boards, the Office of the Attorney General is responsible for the drafting of all of the government's legislation, and also handles all civil litigation matters for the government. 

As of 2019, Sheree Jemmotte-Rodney became the Attorney General of Montserrat, a position she had been acting in for more than a year.

Sir Clare Roberts, who served as the Attorney General for the British Virgin Islands and Antigua and Barbuda, has been identified as a former Attorney General of Montserrat. His years of service are uncertain.

While Gertel Thom has been identified as the first female Attorney-General of Antigua and Barbuda (1998-2001), it is unknown if she was also the first in Montserrat's history.

See also 
 Justice ministry
 Politics of Montserrat

References 

Attorneys general
Government of Montserrat